The City of Thornton is a home rule municipality located in Adams and Weld counties, Colorado, United States. The city population was 141,867, all in Adams County, at the 2020 United States Census, an increase of +19.44% since the 2010 United States Census. Thornton is the sixth most populous city in Colorado and the 191st most populous city in the United States.

History
The town he laid out was the first fully planned community in Adams County, and the first to offer full municipal services from a single tax levy, including recreation services and free trash pickup. Thornton was named in honor of then-incumbent Colorado Governor Dan Thornton.

The Thornton Community Association (TCA) was formed in 1954 to help guide the new community's development. By the end of 1955, Thornton had 5,500 residents in over 1,200 homes. The TCA was instrumental in Thornton's 1956 incorporation as a city. Oyer G. Leary was elected the first mayor.

Geography
Thornton is located at  (39.903043, -104.954406).

At the 2020 United States Census, the town had a total area of  including  of water.

Demographics

As of the 2010 census, there were 118,772 people, 41,359 households, and 30,254 families living in the city. The racial makeup of the city was 77.4% White, 4.4% Asian, 1.8% African American, 1.1% American Indian, 0.1% Pacific Islander, 11.4% from other races, and 3.8% from two or more races. Hispanics and Latinos of any race were 31.7% of the population.

There were 41,359 households, out of which 43.9% had children under the age of 18 living with them, 54.7% were married couples living together, 6.2% had a male householder with no wife present, 12.2% had a female householder with no husband present, and 26.9% were non-families. 20.1% of all households were made up of individuals, and 4.2% had someone living alone who was 65 years of age or older. The average household size was 2.86, and the average family size was 3.32.

The distribution of the population by age was 29.5% under the age of 18, 9.1% from 18 to 24, 32.6% from 25 to 44, 22.3% from 45 to 64, and 6.5% who were 65 years of age or older. The median age was 32.0 years. The gender makeup of the city was 49.5% male and 50.5% female.

The median income for a household in the city was $65,578, and the median income for a family was $74,233. Males had a median income of $49,154 versus $39,596 for females. The city's per capita income was $26,100. About 7.8% of families and 9.9% of the population were below the poverty line, including 14.1% of those under age 18 and 7.4% of those age 65 or over.

Recreation
Recreational facilities include the Margaret Carpenter Recreation Center and the Thornton Community Center. Golf courses include the Thorncreek Golf Course and Todd Creek Golf.

Transportation
Major highways in Thornton are I-25, I-76, SH 7, SH 44, SH 224, and E-470.

Thornton is served by the Denver Regional Transportation District (RTD), which provides bus service to Thornton and the rest of the Denver metropolitan area. The agency opened the N Line commuter rail to Thornton in 2020.

The major airport that serves Thornton is Denver International Airport.

Education
Thornton is served primarily by four school districts: Adams County School District 12, Adams County School District 14 Mapleton Public Schools, and Brighton School District 27J. These include: Eight high schools (Thornton High School and Horizon High School {Both Adams 12}, Riverdale Ridge High School {Brighton 27J}, and five of Mapleton's small by design high schools), eleven middle schools (Five in Adams 12, one in Brighton 27J, five in Mapleton) and twenty elementary schools (Twelve in Adams 12, two in Brighton 27J, and six in Mapleton).

There are also several charter schools in or near Thornton, including Stargate School, Colorado Virtual Academy, New America School, Westgate Community Charter School.

Lord of Life Lutheran School is a Christian Pre-K-8 school of the Wisconsin Evangelical Lutheran Synod in Thornton.

Thornton has several libraries and is served by the Rangeview Library District, also known as Anythink Libraries.

Shopping
Thornton has several shopping areas, such as Larkridge Mall, Thornton Town Center, and Thorncreek Crossing Shopping Center. Larkridge is home to national anchor tenants, big box retailers, and restaurants, and has a pedestrian village. Larkridge is anchored by Colorado's first Sears Grand store, Dick's Sporting Goods, Bed, Bath & Beyond, and PetsMart. DaveCo Liquor Store is the largest liquor store in the world.

Notable people
Notable individuals who were born in or have lived in Thornton include:
 Tesho Akindele (1992- ), soccer forward
 Josh Bredl (1991- ), pro wrestler
 Edward Casso (1974- ), Colorado state legislator
 John Denney (1978- ), football long snapper
 Beth Martinez Humenik, Colorado state legislator
 Mike Manning (1987- ), actor
 Nikki Marshall (1988- ), soccer forward, defender
 Mike McCoy (1953-2016), football cornerback
 Adrian Mora (1978- ), welterweight boxer
 Joseph Salazar, Colorado state legislator
 Kyle Sleeth (1981- ), baseball starting pitcher
 Neal Ulevich (1946- ), photojournalist

See also

Colorado
Bibliography of Colorado
Index of Colorado-related articles
Outline of Colorado
List of places in Colorado
List of counties in Colorado
List of municipalities in Colorado
List of statistical areas in Colorado
Front Range Urban Corridor
North Central Colorado Urban Area
Denver-Aurora, CO Combined Statistical Area
Denver-Aurora-Lakewood, CO Metropolitan Statistical Area

References

External links

City of Thornton website
CDOT map of the City of Thornton

 
Cities in Adams County, Colorado
Cities in Weld County, Colorado
Cities in Colorado
Denver metropolitan area